Muḥakkima and al-Haruriyya refer to the Muslims who rejected arbitration between Ali ibn Abi Talib and Mu'awiya at the Battle of Siffin in 657 CE. The name Muḥakkima derives from their slogan , meaning "judgment (hukm) belongs to God alone". The name al-Haruriyya refers to their withdrawal from Ali's army to the village of Harura' near Kufa. This episode marked the start of the Kharijite movement, and the term muḥakkima is often also applied by extension to later Kharijites.     
 
In recent times, some adherents of Ibadism, which is commonly identified as a moderate offshoot of the Kharijite movement, have argued that the precursors of both Ibadism and extremist Kharijite sects should be properly called Muḥakkima and al-Haruriyya rather than Kharijites.

History 

According al-Shahrastani, an 11th AD century Shafiite scholar, the proto-Kharijite group were called al-Muhakkima al-Ula. They were rooted in the caliphate horsemen that existed back in the times of prophet Muhammad. According to several Hadiths, Hurqus was recorded being prophesied by Muhammad that he will revolt against the Caliphate later.

At first, Hosts of Hurqus were among those who participated in the Muslim conquest of Persia led by Arfajah, Rashidun general who commands the army and navy in Iraq. During Conquest of Khuzestan, Hurqus defeated Hormuzan in 638 at Ahvaz (known as Hormizd-Ardashir in modern era) to subdue the city. However, later during the reign of Uthman, Hurqus was one of the ringleaders from Basra that conspired to assassinate Uthman. They are the soldiers of Ali during the battle of Siffin, who later rebelled towards the Caliphate of Ali and planned their rebellion in the village of Haruri.

The host of Hurqus also contained another Kharijite embryos that hail from Bajila tribe, which led by Abd Allah ibn Wahb al-Rasibi, who latter became founder of Ibadi group.

Battle of Siffin 

During the Battle of Siffin, Mu'awiya proposed to Ali to settle their dispute through arbitration, with each side appointing referees who would pronounce judgment according to the Quran. While most of Ali's army accepted the proposal, one group, mostly from the tribe of Tamim, vehemently objected to the arbitration, seeing it as setting human judgment above God's word. They expressed their protest by proclaiming that "there is no judge but God and there is no judgment but God's". This is a reference to the verse fal-hukmu lillah, Quran 40:12. From this expression, which they were the first to use, they became known as al-muḥakkima, or al-muḥakkima al-ula (lit. the first Muḥakkima). The term may have originally referred ironically to their rejection of arbitration, since the word muhakkim means "arbiter".

Later developments 

The initial group of dissenters went to the village of Harura' near Kufa, where they elected an obscure soldier named Ibn Wahb al-Rasibi as their leader. This gave rise to their alternative name, al-Haruriyya. Other defectors from Kufa, where Ali's army had returned awaiting the outcome of arbitration, gradually joined the dissenters, while Ali persuaded some dissenters to return to Kufa. However, when the arbitration ended in a verdict unfavorable to Ali, a large number of his followers left Kufa to join Ibn Wahb, who had meanwhile moved his camp to another location along the Nahrawan canal. At this point, the Kharijites proclaimed Ali's caliphate to be null and void and began to denounce as infidels anyone who did not accept their point of view. From Nahrawan they began to agitate against Ali and raid his territories. When attempts at conciliation failed, Ali's forces attacked the Kharijites in their camp, inflicting a heavy defeat on them at the Battle of Nahrawan in 658. This bloodshed sealed the split of Kharijites from Ali's followers, and Kharijite calls for revenge ultimately led to Ali's assassination in 661.

On larger scope, remnants of Hurqus group of Muhakkima al-Ula or the Haruriyya proto-Kharijites who has survived the battle of Nahrawan would later influenced the splinter sects of Azariqa, Sufriyyah, Ibadiyyah, Yazidiyyah, Maimuniyyah, Ajaridah, al-Baihasiyyah, and the Najdat radical sects. These violent warrior sects will plagued the entire history of Rashidun Caliphate, Umayyad, and Abbasid with endemic rebellions.

The egalitarian Kharijite doctrine brought by the Sufrite  branch preachers were even also found homage to the flocks of Berbers soldiers due to their largely unequal treatment under caliphate, Thus inciting the Great Berber Revolt which weaken Umayyad caliphate to certain degree.

Etymology of Muhakkima 

The followers of ‘Alī who departed from his army in protest over the arbitration were named Muḥakkima after their cry . The verb  signifies, amongst others, this principle which means to judge, to decide and the verbal noun , a judgment or decision. The participial noun muḥakkima is formed from this verbal noun and denotes collectively all those who proclaim this principle, . The unity of the followers of ‘Alī was sundered in the crisis of the second fitna (64/683) when it split into three main schools, with the extremist Azāriqa and the moderate Ibadis at opposite poles and the Sufris somewhere in between.

Beliefs

The early dissenters wished to secede from Ali's army in order to uphold their principles. They held that the third caliph Uthman had deserved his death because of his faults, and that Ali was the legitimate caliph, while Mu'awiya was a rebel. They believed that the Quran clearly stated that as a rebel Mu'awiya was not entitled to arbitration, but rather should be fought until he repented, pointing to the following verses:

The dissenters held that in agreeing to arbitration Ali committed the grave sin of rejecting God's judgment (hukm) and attempted to substitute human judgment for God's clear injunction, which prompted their motto  ('judgement belongs to God alone'). They also believed that Muslims own allegiance only to the Quran and the sunna of Muhammad, Abu Bakr, and Umar, and denied that the right to the imamate should be based on close kinship with Muhammad. These beliefs found expression in their departure from Ali's army.

Khaled Abou El Fadl writes,

Saba'iyya 
Aside from the name of al-Muhakkima Muslim scholars and chroniclers also coined a name of Saba'iyya towards the group as derogatory nickname, which means "the followers of Abdullah ibn Saba'. As Muhammad Sa'id Roslan, Egyptian Salafi cleric explained the medieval Islamic scholars associate the early Kharijites who killed Uthman as those who follow Abdullah ibn Saba'.

Ibadis and Kharijites 

Both Muslim and non-Muslim scholars tend to refer to Ibadis as "moderate Kharijites", and Ibadis are commonly identified in academic sources as an offshoot of the Kharijite movement, which broke away from more extremist Kharijites currents in the late 7th century CE. Most scholars identify Kharijites as those who seceded from Ali's army because of their rejection of arbitration. Ibadis have traditionally used the adjective Wahbi (referring to Ibn Wahb al-Rasibi) to describe their denomination and strongly identified with ahl al-Nahrawan (the people of Nahrawan). Until recently, some Ibadis also identified Ibadism as a sect of Kharijism. During the 20th century, Ibadis moved away from sectarianism and favored a rapprochement with Sunni Islam. Over time, Ibadis grew uncomfortable with the Kharijite label, and contemporary Ibadis strongly object to being classified as Kharijites. In their objections, some modern Ibadi authors point to the differences between Ibadi doctrine and some of the more extreme beliefs commonly associated with Kharijites. The Ibadi scholar Nasir ibn Silayman al-Sabi'i has argued that the precursors of Ibadis should be called al-Muḥakkima and al-Haruriyya, and that the first clear use of the term khawarij (Kharijites) as a proper noun appears only after the split of Ibadis from more extremist Kharijite sects.

See also
Khawarij
Kharijite Rebellion (866–896)

References

Notes

Sources

Bibliography 

 
 
 
 

 
 

 
Ibadi Muslims
Ibadi Islam
Ibadi studies